The following is a summary of Mayo county football team's 2020 season. The season was suspended in March 2020 due to the COVID-19 pandemic. The season resumed in mid-October of the same year.

Competitions

National Football League Division 1

Table

Reports

Connacht Senior Football Championship

Fixtures

Bracket

All-Ireland Senior Football Championship

Notes

Management team
As of December 2020:
Manager: James Horan
Coach–selectors: James Burke, Ciarán McDonald
Selector: Martin Lally
Goalkeeping coach: Tom Higgins
Strength and conditioning coach: Conor Finn
Statistics: Jack Murray, Evan Gannon
Team doctor: Seán Moffatt
Physiotherapists: Mark Gallagher, Brendan Butler, Darren Flannery
Kitman: Liam Ludden
Logistics: Joe Doyle
Nutritionist: Evan Regan
Performance coach: Martin McIntyre
Values and behaviours coach: Ger Cafferkey
Player welfare: Noel Howley

References

Mayo
Mayo county football team seasons